The Humphrey Archeological Site, near Mullen in Hooker County, Nebraska, was listed on the National Register of Historic Places in 1974.

It was the site of a prehistoric village or camp.  The archeological site is designated by Smithsonian trinomial of 25 HO 21.

It is a village site which is one of only two known in the Sandhills to show evidence of corn cultivation.

It was named for archeologist Humphrey.

References

Further reading
Gunnerson, James H.  An Introduction to Plains Apache Archeology—The Dismal River Aspect.  Anthropological Paper No. 58, Smithsonian Institution, Bureau of American Ethnology Bulletin 173.  Washington: GPO, 1960: 131-261: 187.

National Register of Historic Places in Nebraska
Archaeological sites in Nebraska
Buildings and structures in Hooker County, Nebraska